Cristaria elegans is a species of flowering plant in the family Malvaceae native to Chile.

References 

 Marticorena, C. & M. Quezada. 1985. Catálogo de la Flora Vascular de Chile. Gayana, Bot. 42: 1–157

External links 
 Cristaria elegans at Tropicos

Malveae
Plants described in 1845
Endemic flora of Chile